The Centrair C101 Pegase is a Standard Class single-seat glider manufactured by Centrair starting in 1981. The design uses the ASW 19 fuselage with a new wing designed by ONERA, giving better performance than the German original.

Models manufactured since 1990 as the Pegase 90 are equipped with a different cockpit interior: Shorter handles, smaller instrument panel and minor structural changes. The major difference between the Pegase 90 and previous models was the introduction of flight controls that automatically connect during rigging.

The aircraft structure is composed of laminated fibreglass and epoxy resin. The wing has a laminar flow airfoil with top surface air brakes.

Variants
Centrair 101 Pegase
Prototype Pegase with ASW19-derived fuselage with all-new wings.
C101
 Fitted with fixed landing gear
C101A
 Fitted with retractable landing gear
C101P
 Fitted with fixed landing gear and fittings for optional winglets
C101AP
 Fitted with retractable landing gear and fittings for optional winglets
C101B
 Fitted with CFRP main spar allowing additional water ballast to be carried
C101D
 Altered wing shape, increasing performance
C101BC
 Altered wing shape and CFRP main spar

Specifications (Pégase D)

See also

References

Further reading

External links

 Sailplane Directory

1980s French sailplanes
T-tail aircraft